Chehel Qez va Siah Darreh (also Romanized as Chehel Qez va Sīāh Darreh; also known as Sīāh Darreh and Chehel Qez) is a village in Hesar-e Amir Rural District, in the Central District of Pakdasht County, Tehran Province, Iran. At the 2006 census, its population was 875, in 201 families.

References 

Populated places in Pakdasht County